Ruslan Gadzhievich Gadzhiev (born 29 August 1978, Derbent, Dagestan Autonomous Soviet Socialist Republic) is a Russian politician and a deputy of the 8th State Duma. After graduating from the Law School of Moscow State University in 1999, Gadzhiev had been working for more than ten years in the prosecutor's office and in the tax administration. Later, he was appointed Deputy General Director of the Industrial Development Fund of Moscow. Since September 2021, he has been a deputy of the 8th State Duma from the Tatarstan constituency.

He is one of the members of the State Duma the United States Department of the Treasury sanctioned on 24 March 2022 in response to the 2022 Russian invasion of Ukraine.

References

1978 births
Living people
Eighth convocation members of the State Duma (Russian Federation)
Moscow State University alumni
People from Derbent
Russian individuals subject to the U.S. Department of the Treasury sanctions
United Russia politicians